Amy Folan is the current director of athletics for Central Michigan University. She previously served as associate athletic director for the University of Texas at Austin from 2002 to 2020. Folan previously held administrative positions at the University of Georgia and with the National Collegiate Athletic Association. Folan, a native of Portland, Maine, attended college at the University of Connecticut, where she played on the UConn Huskies women's soccer team as a defender. Folan was named athletic director at Central Michigan University on September 22, 2020.

References

External links
 
Central Michigan Chippewas bio

Year of birth missing (living people)
Living people
Sportspeople from Portland, Maine
Central Michigan Chippewas athletic directors
University of Georgia alumni
Women college athletic directors in the United States
American women's soccer players
Soccer players from Maine
Women's association football defenders
UConn Huskies women's soccer players